The 1918 Manchester North East by-election was a parliamentary by-election held for the House of Commons constituency of Manchester North East on 16 July 1918.

Vacancy
The by-election was caused by the appointment of the sitting Labour MP, J. R. Clynes as Minister of Food Control in the wartime coalition government of David Lloyd George, following the death of Lord Rhondda. Under the regulations of the day, Clynes was obliged to resign his seat and fight a by-election.

Candidates
Clynes was re-selected by the Manchester Labour Party to contest the by-election and there being no other candidates putting themselves forward was returned unopposed.

Result

See also
List of United Kingdom by-elections 
United Kingdom by-election records

References

1918 elections in the United Kingdom
North East
Unopposed ministerial by-elections to the Parliament of the United Kingdom in English constituencies
1918 in England
July 1918 events
1910s in Manchester